Albert Edgar Wright (November 11, 1912 – November 13, 1998), nicknamed "A-1", was a professional baseball player. He appeared in four games in Major League Baseball for the Boston Braves in the 1933 season, three as a second baseman and one as a pinch runner. He was born in San Francisco, California.

In his major league career, Wright was a 1.000 hitter (1-for-1). He also had an extensive minor league baseball career, playing in the Pacific Coast League from 1930 until 1944, retiring in 1946.

Wright died in Oakland, California, at the age of 86.

External links

Baseball Almanac

Major League Baseball second basemen
Boston Braves players
Mission Reds players
San Francisco Seals (baseball) players
Portland Beavers players
Memphis Chickasaws players
Oakland Oaks (baseball) players
York White Roses players
Utica Blue Sox players
Bremerton Bluejackets players
Baseball players from California
1912 births
1998 deaths